Manfred Steffny (born 14 August 1941) is a German long-distance runner. He competed in the marathon at the 1968 Summer Olympics and the 1972 Summer Olympics representing West Germany.

References

External links
 

1941 births
Living people
Athletes (track and field) at the 1968 Summer Olympics
Athletes (track and field) at the 1972 Summer Olympics
German male long-distance runners
German male marathon runners
Olympic athletes of West Germany
Sportspeople from Trier